Harbinger is a 2016 American eco-thriller film written and directed by Cody Duckworth, and produced by Jonathan de la Luz. It stars Dimitrius Pulido, Tina Rodriguez, Paeka Campos and Joseph T. Campos.

Harbinger was among films screened at 22nd San Antonio Film Festival, 19th Cine Las Americas International Film Festival and 49th WorldFest-Houston festival, where it won "Silver Remi Award".

Plot 
The fantasy film follows twelve-year-old girl Mira Gonzaga who has been having terrible dreams after a traumatic brain injury of an undisclosed origin. Taking care of Mira and his pregnant wife, Jesús Gonzaga moves the family away from the city to a secluded ranch in the Texas hill-country. Mira soon discovers that the ranch is just as far from safety. She has vivid night dreams, sees her deceased grandmother and a monster who claims to be her soon-to-be-born brother. There are several hints in the movie that these strange occurrences are taking place as a result of poisoned water from nearby fracking operations.

After Mira's mother dies and Jesús tries to feed Mira poisonous wild boar meat, their neighbor Dimitri comes and saves her, chasing Jesús until giant drilling rigs explode.

Cast 
 Dimitrius Pulido as Jesús Gonzaga
 Tina Rodriguez as Gabriella Gonzaga
 Paeka Campos as Mira Gonzaga
 Joseph T. Campos as Dimitri
 Anne Frances as Abuela
 Gerard Flores	as Kitty (monster)
 Roland Uribe as Doctor

Production 
Harbinger was shot in Texas during summer 2014 between Fischer and Austin. The prime shooting location was Rancho Mirando, a wedding venue in Fischer.

Development 
Harbinger is the debut feature from writer/director Cody Duckworth, who grew up around San Antonio ranches.
Film production spanned over seven years from inception to distribution. The original script was written as a horror film while the director was still in college.  After producer Jonathan de la Luz came on board the project, the script was rewritten, embracing the eco-thriller genre with fracking as the primary threat in the film.

Release 
Harbinger premiered at the Cine Las Americas International Film Festival in Austin, Texas on May 8, 2016. It was intended for digital distribution only. “Harbinger” was released on DVD on February 28, 2017.

References

External links 
 
 Official website

2016 films
2016 independent films
American independent films
Films set on farms
Films set in Texas
Films shot in Texas
2016 horror films
American supernatural horror films
American supernatural thriller films
2010s thriller films
American horror thriller films
Films about families
American natural horror films
2010s English-language films
2010s American films